The Chinese Baptist Convention (CBC) is a Baptist Christian denomination in Taiwan and the territories administered by the Republic of China.

History

Background 

Similar to the Baptist Convention of Hong Kong and the Macau Baptist Convention, the CBC traces its origins from the original missionaries sent by the Triennial Convention to China. The Revd. John William Shuck and his wife, Henrietta Shuck, established their work in Portuguese ruled Macau in 1835 whereas Dr. and Mrs. William Dean began work at the same time among Chaozhou speaking Chinese in Bangkok, Thailand.

The work was relocated to Hong Kong in 1842 where both the Shucks and the Deans worked with the Cantonese and Chaozhou speaking Chinese respectively. They were joined by other missionaries, including Issachar Jacox Roberts, who began mission work in Canton (present day Guangzhou) in 1844, becoming one of the first Western missionary to work outside the relative safety of the protected European factories and the Deans relocated their mission headquarters to Swatow (present day Shantou) in 1860.

By 1949, the American Southern Baptist Mission in China had 220 missionaries working in 392 congregations, 410 outreach points, serving a total of 123,000 Baptist Christians. The bulk of the work was located in the provinces of Kwangtung, Kwangsi, Kiangsu, Honan, Ahnwei, and Shantung and it included institutions like hospitals, schools, and colleges in Pingtu, Longkow, Kweilin, Yangchow, K'aifeng, and a few other cities and towns. By 1951, most foreign missionaries were expelled from mainland China with the establishment of the Three-Self Patriotic Movement.

Work in Taiwan 

In October 1936, a resolution was passed during the centenary celebrations of the Baptist mission in China to engage in the extension of work to the frontier regions, which then included Taiwan which was a part of Japan. With the retrocession of Taiwan to China following the surrender of Japan in 1945, plans were made to expand the mission to Taiwan. A visit was made by a Shanghai missionary, Lila Florence Watson, in February 1948.

In 1948, the National Baptist Convention of China was established in Shanghai and Yang Mei Chai (楊美齋) was sent to Taiwan to establish a frontier mission in June of the same year. Yang was also appointed the head of the Taiwan district of the national convention. Bertha Smith of the American Southern Baptist Mission in Shantung arrived in Taiwan on October 19, 1948 and the first church was inaugurated on December 26 of the same year.

Local ministry 

In the 1950s, the CBC saw an influx of missionaries and refugees from the mainland. This led to the rapid growth of the church particularly in the Mandarin language ministry with significant support from the Southern Baptist Convention in the United States. The first Taiwanese Hokkien service was conducted in at the Amoy Street Baptist Church (廈門街浸信會). In February 1957, the first Taiwanese congregation was established as the Mu Yi Church (慕義堂).

Work among the Hakkas began in 1958 in Miaoli and further work was planted in Pingtung. Work began with the aboriginal peoples of Taiwan as early as 1951 in Liouguei, Kaohsiung with the establishment of the Liouguei Baptist Church (六龜浸信會). Work in languages apart from Mandarin was however generally slow due to the lack of standard materials and work among the aboriginal people was not significant until the first Ami pastor graduated from the Taiwan Baptist Theological Seminary in 1982.

Later developments 

From the period of 1948 to 1954, a total of 11 churches and 22 outreach points had been established by Baptist missionaries and workers. On July 5, 1954, the Taiwan Baptist Association (台灣浸信會聯) was established. It was later renamed the Chinese Baptist Church, Taiwan Province Convention and the Chinese Baptist Church, Taiwan Convention before assuming its current name in 1972.

Similar to Baptist churches elsewhere, churches affiliated with the CBC are autonomous and self-governed and the CBC doesn't exercise any executive authority. The CBC's role is primarily in the coordination of work among the associated churches and the management of inter-church institutions.

Taiwan Baptist Theological Seminary 

The seminary was established in 1952 for the training of national workers. Until recently the seminary had faced problems from the authorities as it was an unrecognized institution and had faced accusations of awarding fraudulent academic degrees in the past. In 2005, the Legislative Yuan passed a resolution to provide for the framework of recognition of religious academic institutions and seminaries allowing the seminary to initiate the procedure of gaining full recognition from the authorities.

Affiliations 

The CBC is a member of the Baptist World Alliance and the Asia Pacific Baptist Federation.

See also 

 Chow Lien-hwa
 Christianity in Taiwan
 Christianity in China
 Asia Pacific Baptist Federation
 Baptist World Alliance

References 

Protestantism in Taiwan
Baptist denominations in Asia